Here Comes the Bride is a lost 1919 American silent comedy film produced by Famous Players-Lasky and released by Paramount Pictures. This film is based on the 1917 Broadway play Here Comes the Bride by Max Marcin and Roy Atwell. The film was directed by John S. Robertson and stars John Barrymore.

Plot
As described in a film magazine, poor young man Frederick Tile (Barrymore) is in love with the daughter of a rich man, and in order to obtain money agrees to marry a veiled woman from whom he will be divorced in one year and allow some schemers to use his name to obtain a vast property.

After the ceremony, the just married groom by a set of logical circumstances comes to spend the night in the mansion of some friends who have just left town. The young woman he loves, Ethel Sinclair (Binney) that same night has left home, leaving a note that says she plans to elope with the man she loves, and by another set of logical circumstances sleeps in an adjacent room at the mansion. The next morning they meet at breakfast while still in their bedclothes, resulting in a comical situation.

Cast
John Barrymore – Frederick Tile
Frank Losee – Robert Sinclair
Faire Binney – Ethel Sinclair
Frances Kay – Nora Sinclair
Alfred Hickman – James Carleton
William David – Thurlow Benson
Leslie King – Ashley
Harry Semels – Sevier

See also
John Barrymore filmography

References

External links

 

John Barrymore and cast in still from Here Comes the Bride 1919
Two scenes from lost film Here Comes the Bride: #1 John Barrymore ....#2 John Barrymore and Faire Binney
Barrymore in comic setting from the film
Great Falls Daily Tribune., February 14, 1919, Page 10

1919 films
American silent feature films
Famous Players-Lasky films
Films about weddings
American films based on plays
Films directed by John S. Robertson
American black-and-white films
Lost American films
1919 comedy films
Silent American comedy films
1919 lost films
Lost comedy films
1910s American films